Ahmed A. Busnaina, Ph.D. is the William Lincoln Smith Chair and University Distinguished Professor, and Director of National Science Foundation’s  Nanoscale Science and Engineering Center (NSEC) for High-rate Nanomanufacturing  and the NSF Center for Nano and Microcontamination Control at  Northeastern University  in  Boston, Massacusetts.

Dr. Busnaina is internationally recognized for his work on nano and micro scale defects mitigation and removal in semiconductor  fabrication. He specializes in directed assembly of nanoelements and in the nanomanufacturing of micro and nanoscale devices. Professor Busnaina authored the only Nanomanufacturing Handbook published in 2006, . He authored more than 500 publications in journals, proceedings and conferences.

He is the editor of the Microelectronic Engineering Journal, and an associate editor of the Journal of Nanoparticle Research. He also serves/served on many advisory boards including Samsung Electronics; Chemical Industry Nanomaterials Roadmap, the International Technology Roadmap for Semiconductors,  Journal of Particulate Science and Technology, Journal of Environmental Sciences Journal of the IEST, Journal of Advanced Applications in Contamination Control.

He is a fellow of National Academy of Inventors (NAI), a fellow of American Society of Mechanical Engineers , and the Adhesion Society. He is a Fulbright Senior Scholar and listed in Marquis Who's Who in the World, Who's Who in America, Who's Who in science and engineering, etc.). He is the 2020 ASME William T. Ennor Manufacturing Technology Award and Medal recipient,    2006 Nanotech Briefs National Nano50 Award recipient, Innovator category, the SØren Buus Outstanding Research Award, Northeastern University 2006, the 2005 Aspiration Award, Northeastern University.

Year of birth missing (living people)
Living people
American nanotechnologists
American mechanical engineers